A31 or A-31 may refer to:
 A31 cefiro, a series of cars by Nissan
 A-31 Vengeance, an American dive bomber from the World War II era
 Archambault A31, a French sailboat design
 HLA-A31, a human serotype
 Samsung Galaxy A31, a mid-range Android smartphone
 IBM ThinkPad A31 laptop computer, produced circa 2002-2004

See also 
 A code for the English Opening in the Encyclopaedia of Chess Openings
 List of highways numbered 31

Roads 
 Highway 31 aka Autoroute 31
 
 A31 motorway (Canada), a road in Quebec connecting Joliette and the A40
 A31 road (England), a road connecting Guildford, Surrey and Bere Regis, Dorset
 A31 motorway (France), a road connecting the Franco-Luxembourg border and Beaune
 A31 motorway (Germany), a road connecting the coast of the North Sea near Emden to the Ruhr area
 A31 road (Isle of Man), a road connecting Port St Mary with the Calf Sound
 A31 motorway (Italy), a road connecting Piovene Rocchette and Albettone - Barbarano Vicentino
 A31 motorway (Netherlands), a road connecting Harlingen and Leeuwarden 
 A31 motorway (Spain), a road connecting Madrid and Alicante
 A31 highway (Sri Lanka), a road connecting Karaithivu and Ampara